Elections to Newry and Mourne District Council were held on 5 May 2005 on the same day as the other Northern Irish local government elections. The election used five district electoral areas to elect a total of 30 councillors.

Election results

Note: "Votes" are the first preference votes.

Districts summary

|- class="unsortable" align="centre"
!rowspan=2 align="left"|Ward
! % 
!Cllrs
! % 
!Cllrs
! %
!Cllrs
! %
!Cllrs
! % 
!Cllrs
! % 
!Cllrs
!rowspan=2|TotalCllrs
|- class="unsortable" align="center"
!colspan=2 bgcolor="" | Sinn Féin
!colspan=2 bgcolor="" | SDLP
!colspan=2 bgcolor="" | UUP
!colspan=2 bgcolor="" | DUP
!colspan=2 bgcolor="" | Green
!colspan=2 bgcolor="white"| Others
|-
|align="left"|Crotlieve
|31.2
|2
|bgcolor="#99FF66"|39.4
|bgcolor="#99FF66"|3
|4.8
|0
|2.8
|0
|8.1
|1
|13.7
|1
|7
|-
|align="left"|Newry Town
|bgcolor="#008800"|46.5
|bgcolor="#008800"|3
|30.5
|3
|6.4
|0
|0.0
|0
|0.0
|0
|16.6
|1
|7
|-
|align="left"|Slieve Gullion
|bgcolor="#008800"|76.1
|bgcolor="#008800"|4
|23.9
|1
|0.0
|0
|0.0
|0
|0.0
|0
|0.0
|0
|5
|-
|align="left"|The Fews
|bgcolor="#008800"|43.4
|bgcolor="#008800"|3
|26.9
|1
|21.5
|1
|8.3
|1
|0.0
|0
|0.0
|0
|6
|-
|align="left"|The Mournes
|12.2
|1
|23.2
|1
|25.2
|2
|bgcolor="#D46A4C"|26.4
|bgcolor="#D46A4C"|1
|0.0
|0
|13.0
|0
|5
|- class="unsortable" class="sortbottom" style="background:#C9C9C9"
|align="left"| Total
|42.1
|13
|29.5
|9
|10.8
|3
|6.7
|2
|2.0
|1
|8.9
|2
|30
|-
|}

District results

Crotlieve

2001: 4 x SDLP, 2 x Sinn Féin, 1 x Independent
2005: 3 x SDLP, 2 x Sinn Féin, 1 x Green, 1 x Independent
2001-2005 Change: Green gain from SDLP

Newry Town

2001: 3 x Sinn Féin, 3 x SDLP, 1 x Independent
2005: 3 x Sinn Féin, 3 x SDLP, 1 x Independent
2001-2005 Change: No change

Slieve Gullion

2001: 4 x Sinn Féin, 1 x SDLP
2005: 4 x Sinn Féin, 1 x SDLP
2001-2005 Change: No change

The Fews

2001: 3 x Sinn Féin, 2 x UUP, 1 x SDLP
2005: 3 x Sinn Féin, 1 x UUP, 1 x SDLP, 1 x DUP
2001-2005 Change: DUP gain from UUP

The Mournes

2001: 2 x UUP, 1 x DUP, 1 x SDLP, 1 x Sinn Féin
2005: 2 x UUP, 1 x DUP, 1 x SDLP, 1 x Sinn Féin
2001-2005 Change: No change

References

Newry and Mourne District Council elections
Newry and Mourne